The evolutionary history of the primates can be traced back 57-90 million years. One of the oldest known primate-like mammal species, Plesiadapis, came from North America; another, Archicebus, came from China. Other similar basal primates were widespread in Eurasia and Africa during the tropical conditions of the Paleocene and Eocene.
Purgatorius is the genus of the four extinct species believed to be the earliest example of a primate or a proto-primate, a primatomorph precursor to the Plesiadapiformes, dating to as old as 66 million years ago.

David Begun has theorised that early primates flourished in Eurasia and that a lineage leading to the African apes and humans, including Dryopithecus, migrated south from Europe or Western Asia into Africa. The early European fauna is exemplified by Darwinius, dated to 47 million years, early Eocene. The surviving tropical population of primates, which is seen most completely in the upper Eocene and lowermost Oligocene fossil beds of the Faiyum depression southwest of Cairo, gave rise to all living species—lemurs of Madagascar, lorises of Southeast Asia, galagos or "bush babies" of Africa, and the anthropoids: platyrrhine or New World monkeys, catarrhines or Old World monkeys, and the great apes, which includes Homo sapiens.

Origins 

The origins and early evolution of primates is shrouded in mystery due to lack of fossil evidence. They are believed to have split from plesiadapiforms in Eurasia around the early Eocene or earlier. The first true primates so far found in the fossil record are fragmentary and already demonstrate the major split between strepsirrhines and haplorines.

Evolution of strepsirrhines 

The earliest strepsirrhines are known as adapiforms, a diverse group that ranged throughout Eurasia and North America. An early branch of this clade gave rise to lemuriform primates, which includes lemurs and their kin.

Evolution of haplorrhines 

The earliest haplorrhine primates from the fossil record are the omomyids, which resembled modern day tarsiers. Like the strepsirrhine adapiforms, omomyids were diverse and ranged throughout Eurasia and North America. The phylogeny of omomyids, tarsiers, and simians is currently unknown.

For many years, it was assumed that primates had first evolved in Africa, and this assumption and the excavations that resulted from it yielded many early simian fossils that chronicled their evolution. Due to the lack of fossils linking simians to the earliest haplorrhines, a more recently discovered stem group called eosimiids found in Asia are thought to have dispersed to Africa and evolved into simians. Eosimiids were very small and similar to tarsiers, though their dentition more closely resembles that of simians.

Evolution of New World monkeys 

Following the emergence of basal simians in Africa, the group split during the Eocene when New World monkeys dispersed to South America, presumably by rafting on mats of vegetation across the much narrower Atlantic Ocean.

Evolution of Old World simians 
The earliest known catarrhine is Kamoyapithecus from uppermost Oligocene at Eragaleit in the northern Kenya Rift Valley, dated to 24 million years ago. Its ancestry is thought to be species related to Aegyptopithecus, Propliopithecus, and Parapithecus from the Faiyum depression, at around 35 million years ago. In 2010, Saadanius was described as a close relative of the last common ancestor of the crown catarrhines, and tentatively dated to 29–28 million years ago, helping to fill an 11-million-year gap in the fossil record. Notable species also include Nsungwepithecus gunnelli and Rukwapithecus fleaglei of the Oligocene.

In the early Miocene, about 22 million years ago, the many kinds of arboreally adapted primitive catarrhines from East Africa suggest a long history of prior diversification. Fossils at 20 million years ago include fragments attributed to Victoriapithecus, the earliest Old World monkey. Among the genera thought to be in the ape lineage leading up to 13 million years ago are Proconsul, Rangwapithecus, Dendropithecus, Limnopithecus, Nacholapithecus, Equatorius, Nyanzapithecus, Afropithecus, Heliopithecus, and Kenyapithecus, all from East Africa.

The presence of other generalized non-cercopithecids of middle Miocene age from sites far distant—Otavipithecus from cave deposits in Namibia, and Pierolapithecus and Dryopithecus from France, Spain and Austria—is evidence of a wide diversity of forms across Africa and the Mediterranean basin during the relatively warm and equable climatic regimes of the early and middle Miocene. The youngest of the Miocene hominoids, Oreopithecus, is from coal beds in Italy that have been dated to 9 million years ago.

Molecular evidence indicates that the lineage of gibbons (family Hylobatidae) diverged from Great Apes some 18–12 million years ago, and that of orangutans (subfamily Ponginae) diverged from the other Great Apes at about 12 million years; there are no fossils that clearly document the ancestry of gibbons, which may have originated in a so-far-unknown South East Asian hominoid population, but fossil proto-orangutans may be represented by Sivapithecus from India and Griphopithecus from Turkey, dated to around 10 million years ago.

Evolution of color vision 

Some of the primates' vertebrate ancestors were tetrachromats, but their nocturnal mammalian ancestors lost two of their four cones during the mesozoic. Most modern primates, however, have evolved to be trichromats. All old world monkeys and apes are trichromats, but new world monkeys are polymorphic trichromats, meaning that males and homozygous females are dichromats while heterozygous females are trichromats (with the exceptions of howler monkeys and night monkeys, who have more and less advanced color vision respectively). 

There are four prevailing theories as to what the evolutionary pressure was for primates to develop trichromatic vision. The Fruit Theory suggests that it was easier for trichromatic primates to find ripe fruit against a green background. While there is data supporting the Fruit Theory, there is some dispute about whether or not trichromacy was more advantageous for determining how ripe fruit was up close or spotting fruit from afar. The Young Leaf hypothesis suggests that primates with more advanced color vision could better spot younger and more nutritious leaves during fruit shortages, while there are also theories that suggest more advanced color vision was better for recognizing changes in skin tone, allowing primates to better determine the blood oxygen saturation of others. other theories indicate that primates' color vision evolved alongside their sense of smell, though research has shown that there is no direct correlation between concentration of olfactory receptors and acquisition of color vision.

Human evolution 

Human evolution is the evolutionary process that led to the emergence of anatomically modern humans, beginning with the evolutionary history of primates – in particular genus Homo – and leading to the emergence of Homo sapiens as a distinct species of the hominid family, the great apes. This process involved the gradual development of traits such as  human bipedalism and language.

The study of human evolution involves many scientific disciplines, including physical anthropology, primatology, archaeology, paleontology, neurobiology, ethology, linguistics, evolutionary psychology, embryology and genetics.

Evolution of the pelvis 
In primates, the pelvis consists of four parts—the left and the right hip bones which meet in the mid-line ventrally and are fixed to the sacrum dorsally and the coccyx. Each hip bone consists of three components, the ilium, the ischium, and the pubis, and at the time of sexual maturity these bones become fused together, though there is never any movement between them. In humans, the ventral joint of the pubic bones is closed.

The most striking feature of evolution of the pelvis in primates is the widening and the shortening of the blade called the ilium. Because of the stresses involved in bipedal locomotion, the muscles of the thigh move the thigh forward and backward, providing the power for bi-pedal and quadrupedal locomotion.

See also 
 Evolution of mammals
 List of fossil primates
 Primate#Evolution
 Timeline of human evolution

References

Bibliography

Further reading 

 Van Schaik, Carel P., and Peter M. Kappeler. "The evolution of social monogamy in primates". Monogamy: mating strategies and partnerships in birds, humans and other mammals. Cambridge University Press, Cambridge (2003): 59–80.

External links 
 The First Primates at anthro.palomar.edu